Sanat Kumar Mandal ( (born 14 February 1942) is an Indian politician  and a leader of the Revolutionary Socialist Party (RSP) political party. He was elected to 7th Lok Sabha in 1980 from Jaynagar constituency of West Bengal. He was re-elected to the Lok Sabha in 1984, 1989, 1991, 1996, 1998, 1999 and 2004 from the same constituency.

References

External links
 Official biographical sketch in Parliament of India website

1942 births
Living people
People from Jaynagar Majilpur
India MPs 2004–2009
Revolutionary Socialist Party (India) politicians
India MPs 1980–1984
India MPs 1984–1989
India MPs 1989–1991
India MPs 1991–1996
India MPs 1996–1997
India MPs 1998–1999
India MPs 1999–2004
Lok Sabha members from West Bengal